The NME Album of the Year and Single Of The Year were announced on 30 November 2010. It was the 37th countdown of the most popular albums and tracks of the year, as chosen by music reviewers and independent journalists who work for the magazine and for NME.com.

Albums

Bold: Album contains Song of the Year

Countries represented
 = 26
 = 21
 = 3
 = 1

Singles

Artists with multiple entries

2 Entries
Foals (1, 41)
M.I.A. (2, 11)
Arcade Fire (5, 39)
LCD Soundsystem (13, 23)
Yeasayer (22, 30)

Countries represented

 = 27
 = 20
 = 3
 = 2
 = 1

References

New Musical Express
2010 in British music
British music-related lists